Vincent Como (born 1975) is a Brooklyn-based visual artist.  His work is rooted in Minimalism, Conceptual Art, and Color Field Painting with a specific focus toward Black.  Como has referenced the influence of Ad Reinhardt and Kasimir Malevich, as well as movements such as the Italian Arte Povera movement from the 1960s.

Como graduated from the Cleveland Institute of Art's BFA program in 1998 and lived, worked and exhibited widely throughout Chicago and the Midwest from 1998 until relocating to New York in 2006.  His 2007 concurrent solo exhibitions “In Praise of Darkness” at Chicago's Western Exhibitions and “Black: Theories and Ongoing Research” at VONZWECK, also in Chicago, were documented in a joint catalog with an essay by artist and curator John Neff and an interview with Phillip von Zweck proprietor of VONZWECK.   He was selected as one of the artists representing the United States in the 2nd Vienna Biennale in 2008.

Como's work employs the use of the black field as a meditation on the constituent associations of the color black (Black Holes, Evil, Darkness) sometimes alongside referential diagrams detailing the focus of the Painting/Drawing/Object.

Solo and Two Person Exhibitions
 2013: Paradise Lost, MINUS SPACE, Brooklyn, NY
 2012: Correlation of Space: Vincent Como and Gehry Kohler, City Ice Arts, Kansas City, MO
 2011: Toward Singularity, Sommerkampf, Piermont, NY
 2010: Haunting Modernity, House Gallery, Salt Lake City, UT
 2010: Black Mass, Proof Gallery, Boston, MA
 2009: Vincent Como and Joseph Sabatino, PS 122, New York, NY
 2008: The Blackening, Secret Project Robot, Brooklyn, NY
 2007: In Praise of Darkness, Western Exhibitions, Chicago, Illinois
 2007: Black: Theories and Ongoing Research, VONZWECK, Chicago, Illinois
 2006: As Defined By Our Surroundings, Presented by Dogmatic at ArtLA, Santa Monica, CA
 2004: Object (Subject), Standard, Chicago, Illinois
 2002: Untitled (Dogmatic Exhibition), Dogmatic, Chicago, Illinois
 1998: Untitled (Inflated Space), Southside Gallery, Cleveland, OH

Group exhibitions
 2016: Fabulous You, TSA New York, Brooklyn, NY
 2016: Death: A Summer Show, Trestle Projects, Brooklyn, NY, curated by Melissa Staiger
 2016: On Paper, MINUS SPACE, Brooklyn, NY
 2016: After; Curious Matter, Jersey City NJ, curated by Arthur Bruso
 2015: The Violent Study Club, Stout Projects, Brooklyn, NY
 2015: Dreams Were Made For Mortals VI, St. Vitus, Brooklyn, NY curated by Karlynn Holland
 2015: 10 Part Invention, JAUS Gallery, Los Angeles, CA
 2015: Matters of the Jugular, SUGAR, Brooklyn, NY
 2015: Improvised Showboat #12, Curated by Lauren Britton and Zachary Keeting, Gary Stephan Studio, New York, NY
 2015: Nothing = Everything, c2c/wc Project Space, San Francisco, CA
 2015: Elements, MINUS SPACE, Brooklyn, NY
 2014: Triangles, Ventanna 244, Brooklyn, NY curated by Melissa Staiger
 2014: Painting Black, Sylvia Wald and Po Kim Art Gallery, New York, NY, curated by Ivo Ringe and Joe Barnes, with among others Ivo Ringe, Heiner Thiel etc.
 2014: About a Mountain, Asya Geisberg Gallery, New York, NY, curated by Holly Jarrett
 2014: Reductions, City Ice Arts, Kansas City, MO
 2014: To TSA, With Love, Tiger Strikes Asteroid, Philadelphia, PA
 2014: Keyed up in Bushwick, 56 Bogart, Brooklyn, NY curated by Key Projects, hosted by Carol Salmanson
 2014: The Heroic Object, Parallel Art Space, Ridgewood, NY
 2014: Make/Shift, Folioleaf, Brooklyn, NY
 2013: Half Life, The Prayzner Residence, Brooklyn, NY
 2013: Paint it Black, Guest Spot, Baltimore, MD
 2013: Meta Vista, 16 Wilson (formerly Storefront Bushwick), Brooklyn, NY curated by Matthew Neil Gehring, hosted by Deborah Brown
 2013: Makers Manual, The Institute Library, New Haven, CT organized by Melanie Carr
 2013: That Summer Feeling, Sweatshop Studios, Brooklyn, NY curated by George Terry
 2013: Baracca: Ritual and Practice, BuroRotterdam, Rotterdam, Netherlands, curated by Yvo van der Vat and Ibrahim Ineke
 2013: Correspondence I, Tiger Strikes Asteroid, Philadelphia, PA
 2012: Neither Here Nor There But Anywhere and Everywhere, MINUS SPACE, Brooklyn, NY
 2012: We Have Relocated To Our New Location, Picture Farm, Brooklyn, NY organized by Karl LaRocca and Kayrock Screenprinting
 2012: MINUS SPACE en Oaxaca, Multiple Cultural Venues, Oaxaca, Mexico, curated by Matthew Deleget and Emi Winter
 2012: Possibly the Last Postcard Show, Gallery Wolfy Part II, Cleveland, OH
 2012: Brucennial 2012, 159 Bleeker St, NYC, organized by the Bruce High Quality Foundation
 2012: (No) Vacancy, Carrie Secrist Gallery, Chicago, Illinois
 2012: Black Thorns in the White Cube, Paragraph Gallery, Kansas City, MO and Western Exhibitions, Chicago IL, curated by Amelia Ishmael
 2012: Dreams Were Made For Mortals III, St Vitus, Brooklyn, NY curated by Karlynn Holland
 2012: Lineup, SUGAR, Brooklyn, NY (Rounds 3 and 4 of a season-long rotating exhibition)
 2011: Ritual Aesthetics, Tompkins Projects, Brooklyn, NY, curated by Progress Report
 2011: Lineup, SUGAR, Brooklyn, NY (Rounds 1 and 2 of a season-long rotating exhibition)
 2011: We Still See The Black, New Art Center, Newtonville, MA, curated by Alexander DeMaria and Owen Rundquist
 2011: Brandt 21, Brandt Gallery, Cleveland, OH
 2011: Chain Letter, Samson Projects, Boston, MA
 2011: Salt Lake City Biennial, House Gallery, Salt Lake City, UT
 2011: Chinese Take Out, Art in General, New York, NY, organized by Jason Bailer Losh
 2011: Heads on Poles, Western Exhibitions, Chicago IL, curated by Paul Nudd and Scott Wolniak
 2010: Ace of Spades: Alexander Binder, Vincent Como, and Hilda Shen, SUGAR, Brooklyn, NY
 2010: Ah Wilderness!, Ebersmoore, Chicago, Illinois
 2010: Psychopomp, Curious Matter, Jersey City, NJ
 2010: Black Lab, The Lab, San Francisco, CA
 2010: Drawing on Drawing, Deep Space New York, curated by Rory Donaldson and Erica Mercado
 2010: Art/Value/Currency, the Pigeon Wing, London, England and Eastern District, Brooklyn, NY curated by Isobel Shirley
 2010: The Artists Guide to the L.A. Galaxy, West Los Angeles College Art Gallery, Culver City, CA curated by Michael Arata and qi peng
 2009: Artist Books and Prints, Central Booking, Brooklyn, NY
 2009: A Book About Death, Emily Harvey Foundation Gallery, New York, NY
 2009: Human Craters, BRIC Rotunda Gallery, Brooklyn, NY curated by Andrea Horisaki-Christens
 2009: Infinite Possibilities, MomentaArt, Brooklyn, NY
 2009: Alchemy, Hudson Guild Galleries. New York, NY
 2008: Black, G Fine Art, Washington DC
 2008: VIENNABiennale2, Vienna, Austria
 2008: VONZWECK at the Barn, Chicago, Illinois
 2008: Hocus Pocus, Curious Matter, Jersey City, NJ
 2008: New American Paintings, Exhibition in Print, Issue #74 Northeastern edition
 2007: New York, NY 2007, McCormack Gallery, New York, NY
 2007: If Then, As If, One Night Stand, Brooklyn, NY
 2006: Contemporary Works on Paper, Barrow and Juarez Gallery, Milwaukee, WI
 2006: Under Cover, Urban Institute for Contemporary Arts, Grand Rapids, MI
 2006: Evanston+Vicinity Biennial, Evanston Art Center, Evanston, IL
 2006: Group Exhibition, Drawing and Book Art gallery of Western Exhibitions, Chicago, Illinois
 2006: Fresh A.I.R., Noyes Cultural Arts Center, Evanston, IL
 2006: Perfect, a Group Exhibition, through the Illinois State Museum: Southern Illinois Art Gallery, Whittington, IL; Illinois State Museum, Lockport, IL
 2005: Drawn Out, Gallery 400, University of Illinois at Chicago, Chicago, Illinois
 2005: Perfect, the Petite Selection, Fermilab National Accelerator Laboratory Art Gallery, Batavia, IL
 2005: Perfect, a Group Exhibition, traveling exhibition shown at: Urban Institute for Contemporary Arts, Grand Rapids, MI; Art Museum of the University of Memphis, Memphis, TN
 2005: Artists in Residence, Anchor Graphics, Chicago, Illinois
 2004: Varied Marks: Contemporary Drawings and Works on Paper, Moser Performing Arts Center Gallery, University of St. Francis, Joliet, IL
 2004: Perfect, a Group Exhibition, Chicago Cultural Center, Chicago, Illinois
 2004: Art Miami, with Schopf Gallery on Lake, Miami, FL
 2003: Pyramid Scheme (a curatorial project and exhibition), Schopf Gallery on Lake, Chicago, Illinois
 2003: Art Boat, with Dogmatic, Chicago, Illinois
 2003: Stray Show, with Dogmatic, Chicago, Illinois
 2002: Selections I, SPACES Gallery, Cleveland, OH
 2001: Traumaspace3, Traumaspace, Chicago, Illinois
 2000: Multiples4, NFA Space, Chicago, Illinois
 2000: 48 Hours of Making Art, B.K. Smith Gallery, Lake Erie College, Painsville, OH
 1999: Hot Beats and Renditions, Butcher Shop, Chicago, Illinois
 1999: Squirrels on Parade, Suitable, Chicago, Illinois
 1998: The Artist Book II, FACET, Taos, NM

References

External links
 Vincent Como's Website
 Art/Value/Currency Project Interview
 PS1 Studio Visit
 Vincent Como and Joseph Gerard Sabatino at PS 122
 Human Craters at the BRIC Rotunda Gallery
 In Praise of Darkness at Western Exhibitions
 Black: Theories and Ongoing Research at VONZWECK

1975 births
Living people
American artists